The Women's sprint competition at the 2017 World Championships was held on 27 January 2017.

A qualification was held to determine the 15 participants.

Results
The final was started at 13:33.

References

Women's sprint